Seydou Keïta (anglicised to Keita; born 16 January 1980) is a Malian former footballer. A versatile midfielder, he operated as both a central or defensive midfielder.

Keita most notably played for Lens (five seasons) and Barcelona (four), winning 14 titles with the latter club after signing in 2008. He started his youth career in Mali and his professional career with Marseille. His career would take him to clubs in France, Spain, China, Italy and Qatar.

Keita represented Mali since the age of 18, appearing in seven Africa Cup of Nations tournaments and winning 102 caps. He also held a French passport.

Club career

Marseille
Born in Bamako, Mali, Keita finished his football formation in France with Olympique de Marseille, joining the club at the age of 17. He played mainly for the reserve squad during his three-year spell.

Keita made his Ligue 1 debut for L'OM on 19 September 1999 in a 1–0 home win against Troyes AC, adding three games in the season's UEFA Champions League. In the summer of 2000, he left the Stade Vélodrome.

Lorient and Lens
Keita signed for FC Lorient in Ligue 2, being instrumental (37 games, one goal) as the team promoted to the top level in 2001. He appeared slightly less due to injury in the following season, which ended in immediate relegation, but brought the conquest of the Coupe de France, the club's first-ever; he played the full 90 minutes in the final against SC Bastia.

In 2002, Keita joined fellow league side RC Lens, eventually becoming captain and scoring a career-best 13 goals in the 2006–07 season – his fifth and last – helping Les Sang et Or to fifth position in the league and the last-16 in the UEFA Cup.

Sevilla
On 11 July 2007, Keita signed a four-year contract with Sevilla FC for a €4 million transfer fee, plus a 10–15% capital gain for the club if it sold the player above €4 million. He appeared in both legs of that year's Supercopa de España, a 6–3 aggregate win against Real Madrid.

Keita was an automatic first-choice for the Andalusians during 2007–08, helping the team to the fifth position in the league. On 3 November 2007 he scored from long-distance in a 2–0 home win also over Real Madrid, and added three in nine matches in the Champions League, including one against Arsenal in a 3–1 group stage home victory which was the opposition's first loss of the campaign.

Barcelona

On 26 May 2008, Keita agreed to a four-year deal with FC Barcelona who paid his €14 million buy-out clause (making Lens eligible to receive €1.3 million from Sevilla). He became the first Malian player to ever represent the Catalans, and his new release clause was set at €90 million.

Keita made his official debut for Barcelona in a Champions League qualifier against Poland's Wisła Kraków on 13 August 2008, a 4–0 home win. He made his league debut against CD Numancia on the 31st, coming on as a substitute for Andrés Iniesta midway through the second half of a 0–1 away loss.

Keita scored his first goal for the team on 16 November 2008, in a 2–0 win at Recreativo de Huelva. The following week he added another, in a 1–1 home draw to Getafe CF; he finished his first season at the Camp Nou with 46 official appearances as Barça won the treble, and played 20 minutes in the Champions League final, taking the place of Thierry Henry in the 2–0 triumph against Manchester United.

On 25 October 2009, Keita scored his first career hat-trick, in a 6–1 home win against Real Zaragoza, and contributed with 29 games – 23 starts – as Barcelona renewed its domestic supremacy. In the 2010–11 campaign he made more appearances than any other outfield player and, on 31 August, aged 31, signed a contract extension that would link him to the club until 2014.

Dalian Aerbin
On 7 July 2012, Keita announced he would be leaving Barcelona after four seasons, invoking a clause in his contract allowing him to leave the club even though he still had two years left. The following day, he signed a two-and-a-half-year deal with Chinese Super League side Dalian Aerbin FC, being reportedly paid €14 million per year.

Valencia

On 30 January 2014, Keita returned to Spain after signing with Valencia CF, with the 34-year-old agreeing to a six-month contract with the option for an additional year. He made his debut for the Che on 16 February, replacing Paco Alcácer for the last 20 minutes of a 0–0 away draw against former club Sevilla. On 13 March, midway through the first half of an away fixture against PFC Ludogorets Razgrad for the UEFA Europa League, he was sent off for a challenge on Roman Bezjak that resulted in a penalty kick, but his team eventually won it 3–0 and 4–0 on aggregate.

Keita scored Valencia's fastest-ever goal on 27 March 2014, netting after nine seconds at UD Almería. He also had to leave before the end of the first half with an injury, as the hosts came from behind for a 2–2 draw.

Roma
On 5 June 2014, Keita signed a one-year contract with Serie A club A.S. Roma. He made his competitive debut in the opening day of the season, against ACF Fiorentina (2–0 win), and scored his first goal on 9 November to help defeat Torino F.C. 3–0 also at the Stadio Olimpico.

Keita agreed to a new one-year deal in the 2015 off-season.

El Jaish
Keita retired at the age of 37, after one season in the Qatar Stars League with El Jaish SC.

International career

Keita helped Mali's under-20s finish third at the 1999 FIFA World Youth Championship in Nigeria, scoring the only goal in the last match against Uruguay, and being named the tournament's best player. He made his senior debut for Mali on 9 April 2000, in a 2002 FIFA World Cup qualifier against Libya. He wore the no.12 shirt as he represented the country in six Africa Cup of Nations tournaments: in the 2010 edition in Angola he scored twice, both goals coming in the 4–4 group stage draw against the hosts, who were leading 4–0 with 11 minutes to go; Les Aigles, however, could not make it past the group stage. From 2007 to 2008, he scored an impressive 8 goals in 20 international matches from his midfield position.

Keita also participated in the 2013 Africa Cup of Nations in South Africa, scoring in the 1–1 quarterfinal draw against the hosts as Mali eventually won the shootout.

Personal life
Keita's uncle, Salif Keïta, was also a footballer. He played, amongst others, for Saint-Étienne, Marseille, Valencia and Sporting CP, and was once voted African Footballer of the Year.

Keita married Zubaida Johnson, of Cape Verdean descent. On 12 May 2008, he became the father of a son, Mohammed, who was born in Seville, also father of Hanane, Ishana and Zulaykah all born in Barcelona, Catalunya.

Career statistics

Club
Sources:

International
Source:

Scores and results list Mali's goal tally first, score column indicates score after each Mali goal.

Honours
Lorient
Coupe de France: 2001–02

Lens
UEFA Intertoto Cup: 2005

Sevilla
Supercopa de España: 2007
UEFA Super Cup: runner-up 2007

Barcelona
La Liga: 2008–09, 2009–10, 2010–11
Copa del Rey: 2008–09, 2011–12; runner-up 2010–11
Supercopa de España: 2009, 2010, 2011
UEFA Champions League: 2008–09, 2010–11
UEFA Super Cup: 2009, 2011
FIFA Club World Cup: 2009, 2011
Mali
FIFA U-20 World Cup third place: 1999
Africa Cup of Nations third place: 2012, 2013
Individual
FIFA U-20 World Cup: Golden Ball 1999
CAF Team of the Year: 2009, 2011
Ligue 1 UNFP Team of the Year: 2006–07
Africa Cup of Nations Team of the Tournament: 2002, 2010, 2012, 2013

See also
 List of men's footballers with 100 or more international caps

References

External links

 
 
 
 
 

1980 births
Living people
Malian emigrants to France
Naturalized citizens of France
Sportspeople from Bamako
Malian footballers
Association football midfielders
JS Centre Salif Keita players
Olympique de Marseille players
FC Lorient players
RC Lens players
Sevilla FC players
FC Barcelona players
Valencia CF players
Dalian Professional F.C. players
A.S. Roma players
El Jaish SC players
Ligue 1 players
Ligue 2 players
La Liga players
Chinese Super League players
Serie A players
Qatar Stars League players
UEFA Champions League winning players
Mali under-20 international footballers
Mali international footballers
2002 African Cup of Nations players
2004 African Cup of Nations players
2008 Africa Cup of Nations players
2010 Africa Cup of Nations players
2012 Africa Cup of Nations players
2013 Africa Cup of Nations players
2015 Africa Cup of Nations players
FIFA Century Club
Malian expatriate footballers
Malian expatriate sportspeople in France
Malian expatriate sportspeople in Spain
Malian expatriate sportspeople in China
Malian expatriate sportspeople in Italy
Malian expatriate sportspeople in Qatar
Expatriate footballers in France
Expatriate footballers in Spain
Expatriate footballers in China
Expatriate footballers in Italy
Expatriate footballers in Qatar